Amadeus II may refer to:

 Amadeus II, Count of Savoy (c. 1050–1080), Count of Savoy
 Amadeus II of Montfaucon (1130–1195), Count of Montbéliard
 Amadeus II of Geneva (died 1308), Count of Geneva